The 2019 Wuhan Zall F.C. season was Wuhan Zall's first season in the Chinese Super League since it started in the 2004 season, and their first season in the top flight of Chinese football. During this season, Wuhan Zall participated in the Chinese Super League and Chinese FA Cup.

Transfers and loans

Squad statistics

Appearances and goals

|-
! colspan=14 style=background:#dcdcdc; text-align:center| Players transferred out during the season

Disciplinary record

Friendlies

Pre-season

Competitions

Chinese Super League

Table

Results summary

Results by round

Matches
All times are local (UTC+8).

Source:

Chinese FA Cup

References

Wuhan F.C. seasons
Wuhan